Kothavalasa Junction railway station (station code: KTV) located in the Indian state of Andhra Pradesh, serves Kothavalasa in Vizianagaram district. It is a major freight transit point with iron ore rakes travelling from mines around Kirandul and Bailadila in Chhattisgarh to Visakhapatnam Port.

History
Between 1893 and 1896,  of the East Coast State Railway was opened for traffic. In 1898–99, Bengal Nagpur Railway was linked to the lines in southern India.

In 1960, Indian Railways took up three projects: the Kothavalasa–Araku–Koraput–Jeypore–Jagdalpur–Dantewara–Kirandaul line, the Jharsuguda–Sambalpur–Bargarh–Balangir–Titlagarh Project and the Biramitrapur–Rourkela–Bimlagarh–Kiriburu Project. All the three projects taken together were popularly known as the DBK Project or the Dandakaranya Bolangir Kiriburu Project (under Dandakaranya Project). The Kothavalasa–Kirandaul line was opened in 1966–67.

Electrified 
The Visakhapatnam–Kothavalasa–Araku–Koraput–Jeypore Jagdalpur–Dantewara–Kirandul section was electrified in the year 1980–83.

Railway reorganization

The Bengal Nagpur Railway was nationalized in 1944.Eastern Railway was formed on 14 April 1952 with the portion of East Indian Railway Company east of Mughalsarai and the Bengal Nagpur Railway. In 1955, South Eastern Railway was carved out of Eastern Railway. It comprised lines mostly operated by BNR earlier. Amongst the new zones started in April 2003 were East Coast Railway  and South East Central Railway. Both these railways were carved out of South Eastern Railway. Railway. South Coast Railway was carved out of East Coast Railway and South Central Railway on 27 feb 2019.

References

Railway stations in Vizianagaram district
Railway stations in Waltair railway division
Railway stations in India opened in 1896